The following is a list of published works by David Madden (born July 25, 1933), including his novels, short stories, and literary criticism. He also published several poems and works of nonfiction.

Fiction

Novels
 The Beautiful Greed (1961)
 Hair of the Dog (serialized novel) (1967)
 Cassandra Singing (1969)
 Brothers in Confidence (1972)
 Bijou (1974)
 The Suicide's Wife (1978)
 Pleasure-Dome (1979)
 On the Big Wind (1980)
 Sharpshooter: A Novel of the Civil War (1996)
 Abducted by Circumstance (2010)
 London Bridge in Plague and Fire (2012)

Short Story Collections
 The Shadow Knows (1970)
 The New Orleans of Possibilities (1982)

Short Stories

 “Imprisoned Light” (1952)
 “Gristle” (1956)
 “Hurry Up Please It's Time” (1959)
 “Bearers of the Dead” (1959)
 “My Name Is Not Antonio” (1960)
 “Adonis in the Underworld” (1961)
 “The Shadow Knows” (1963)
 “Something Mourns” (n.d.)
 “Cassandra Singing” (1964)
 “The Singer” (1966)
 “Thad Miller and Atlas” (1966)
 “Lone Riding” (1966)
 “Big Bob's Night Owl Show” (1966)
 “Mirage” (1967)
 “A Piece of the Sky” (1967)
 “Big Bob and the Hellhounds” (1967)
 “Children of a Cold Sun” (1967)
 “The Master's Thesis” (1967)
 “Cassandra Singing: A Rasping of Leather” (1967)
 “Lorashan: A Romantic Tale” (1968)
 “Love Makes Nothing Happen” (1968)
 “The Day the Flowers Came” (1968)
 “Nothing Dies but Something Mourns” (1968)
 “The Passenger” (1969)
 “Skin Deep” (1969)
 “A Voice in the Garden” (1969)
 “On Target” (1969)
 “No Trace” (1970)
 “Home Comfort” (1970)
 “A Human Interest Death” (1970)
 “Frank Brown's Brother” (1970)
 “The House of Pearl” (1970)
 “The Pale Horse of Fear” (1970)
 “Night Shift” (1971)
 “Seven Frozen Starlings” (1971)
 “A Secondary Character” (1972)
 “Lindbergh's Rival” (1973)
 “Here He Comes! There He Goes!” (1973)
 “Wanted: Ghost Writer” (1973)
 “The Phantom Circuit” (1975)

 “Second Look Presents: The Rape of an Indian Brave” (1975)
 “From God's Typewriter” (1975)
 “Wipes and Finales, or Machine Close-Outs” (1976)
 “In the Bag” (1977)
 “The Hero and the Witness” (1977)
 “On the Big Wind” (1978)
 “Putting an Act Together” (1980)
 “Code-A-Phone” (1983)
 “Three of Them” (1984)
 “Lights” (1984–85)
 “Willis Carr at Bleak House” (1985)
 “The Eyes of Another” (1985)
 “Rosanna” (1985)
 “Was Jesse James at Rising Fawn?” (1985)
 “A Fever of Dying” (1986)
 “Children of the Sun” (1988)
 “Gristle” 1988)
 “The Invisible Girl” (1989)
 “Crossing the Lost and Found River” (1989)
 “The Demon in My View” (1989)
 “Willis Carr, Sharpshooter” (1989)
 “The Burning of the Railroad Bridges on the Grand Trunk Line in the Great Valley of East Tennessee” (1989)
 “The Satirist's Daughter” (1989)
 “The Violent Meditations of Willis Carr, Sharpshooter (1848-1933)” (1990)
 “James Agee Never Lived in This House” (1990)
 “A Forgotten Nightmare” (1991)
 “The Last Bizarre Tale” (1991)
 “A Survivor of the Sinking of the Sultana” (1992)
 “The Invisible Girl” (1993)
 “The Retriever” (excerpt) (1993)
 “Fragments Found on the Field” (1994)
 “Hairtrigger Pencil Lines” (1994)
 “Retracing My Steps” (1994)
 “Over the Cliff” (1995)
 “A Walk with Thomas Jefferson at Poplar Forest” (1996)
 “The Retriever” (1996)
 “Cherokee Is Missing” (1996)
 “The Incendiary at the Forks of the River” (2003-4)
 “London Bridge Nocturnes: January, A Memoir” (2005)

Nonfiction

Literary Criticism

Authored
 The Poetic Image in 6 Genres (1969)
 Harlequin’s Stick, Charlie’s Cane: A Comparative Study of Commedia dell’arte and Silent Slapstick Comedy (1975)
 A Primer of the Novel (1980)
 Writers’ Revisions (1981)
 Revising Fiction: A Handbook for Writers (1988)
 Beyond the Battlefield (2000)
 Touching the Web of Southern Novelists (2006)
 The Tangled Web of the Civil War and Reconstruction (forthcoming in 2015)

Compiled/Edited
 Rediscoveries (1971)
 American Dreams, American Nightmares (1972)
 Proletarian Writers of the Thirties (1979)
 Tough Guy Writers of the Thirties (1979)
 Rediscoveries II (1988)

References

External links

 David Madden website

Madden